Messenger Press was the publishing house of the Lutheran Free Church (LFC). At the time of the merger of the Lutheran Free Church with other church bodies to form the "new" American Lutheran Church, Messenger Press merged with the other publishing houses to form Augsburg Fortress.

Christian publishing companies
Book publishing companies based in Minnesota
Publishing companies established in 1988
Evangelical Lutheran Church in America